The Somme Heritage Centre is a tourist attraction and education centre in Newtownards, County Down, Northern Ireland. Opened in 1994 the centre promotes Ireland's role in the First World War, and especially the role of both Protestant and Catholic, unionist and nationalist in the war. It focuses on three of the volunteer divisions in Ireland;
 10th (Irish) Division
 16th (Irish) Division
 36th (Ulster) Division

See also
 Northern Ireland War Memorial
 The Cenotaph, Belfast

External links
The Somme Heritage Centre Homepage
Information and Picture Collection from The Somme Heritage Centre
 Second World War online resource for NI

Buildings and structures in County Down
World War I museums in the United Kingdom
Museums established in 1994
Military and war museums in Northern Ireland
Museums in County Down
Military history of County Down
1994 establishments in Northern Ireland